Freiheit (German for "freedom") is a 1966 short film by George Lucas, made while he was a student at the University of Southern California's film school.  His third film, it was the first to contain a narrative.

Plot
The film follows a student's attempt to escape to freedom. This student (Randal Kleiser) tries to run across the Berlin border from East to West Germany, but ends up being shot in the chest and side gut and is mortally wounded. While he dies, he thinks about dying for freedom.

Production
The movie was filmed entirely in Malibu Creek, California.

See also
List of American films of 1966

References

External links
 

1966 films
Cold War films
Films set in East Germany
Short films directed by George Lucas
American short films
American student films
Films about the Berlin Wall
1960s English-language films